This was the first edition of the tournament.

Marta Kostyuk won the title, defeating Aliona Bolsova in the final, 6–1, 6–0.

Seeds

Draw

Finals

Top half

Bottom half

References

Main Draw

Zed Tennis Open 2 - Singles